Santa Catarina Albarradas Zapotec, also known as San Antonio Albarradas Zapotec, is a Zapotec language of Oaxaca, Mexico. Speakers find neighboring Santo Domingo Albarradas Zapotec marginally intelligible (80%), but the reverse is not the case (50%).

See also
Albarradas Sign Language

References

Zapotec languages